James Mills Peirce (May 1, 1834 – March 21, 1906) was an American mathematician and educator. He taught at Harvard University for almost 50 years.

Early life and family
He was the eldest son of Sarah Hunt (Mills) Peirce and Benjamin Peirce (1809–1880), a professor of astronomy and mathematics at Harvard University. The family was considered part of the Boston Brahmin elite class. The surname is pronounced to rhyme with "". Benjamin Peirce's father, also named Benjamin, was librarian at Harvard. James had four younger siblings; one brother was philosopher, logician and professor Charles Sanders Peirce (1839–1914). Another brother was Herbert Henry Davis Peirce (1849–1916) who was the First Secretary of the American Embassy in Saint Petersburg, Russia, at the end of the 19th century.

J. M. Peirce graduated from Harvard College in 1853. While an undergraduate at Harvard, he was a member of the Hasty Pudding Club. He attended Harvard's law school for one year. In 1857, he enrolled at the university's Divinity School and graduated in 1859.

Career
Like his father, James Mills Peirce became a professor of mathematics and astronomy at Harvard. He was first a Tutor in Mathematics, then a proctor at Harvard. He was a preacher in Boston and Charleston, South Carolina, but eventually returned to academia, first as Assistant Professor of Mathematics in 1861. He was promoted to University Professor of Mathematics in 1869, then to Perkins Professor of Astronomy and Mathematics — the same position his father once held — in 1885. He was head of the Graduate Department at Harvard from 1872 to 1895 (becoming its dean when it was converted to the Graduate School). He was the Dean of the Faculty of Arts and Sciences from 1895 to 1898.

Among his publications are Mathematical Tables Chiefly to Four Figures (1896) and A Text-Book of Analytic Geometry; On the Basis of Professor Peirce’s Treatise (1857). He was considered a world authority on quaternions.

Personal life

Notes and references

1834 births
1906 deaths
American educators
19th-century American mathematicians
Harvard Divinity School alumni
Hasty Pudding alumni
Harvard University faculty